Wayne Rooney, an English former association footballer, made his debut for England in a 3–1 defeat to Australia on 13 February 2003. He scored his first international goal later that year, in his sixth appearance for his country, against Macedonia. He retired from international football in November 2018, with a record of 53 goals in 120 international appearances, making him England's joint all-time top scorer alongside Harry Kane; he surpassed Bobby Charlton's record with a penalty against Switzerland at Wembley Stadium during Euro 2016 qualification.

Rooney's goal against Macedonia made him the youngest goalscorer for England, aged 17 years 317 days, surpassing the record set by Michael Owen who had scored against Morocco in 1998 during the King Hassan II International Cup Tournament. It also made Rooney the youngest scorer in qualifying for the European Championships, a record he held until Israel's Ben Sahar scored against Estonia in March 2007.  In June 2004, Rooney scored the first of England's three goals in a victory over Switzerland during Euro 2004, and in doing so became the youngest player to score in a European Championship match. It was a brief record: Switzerland's Johan Vonlanthen, three months younger than Rooney, scored four days later.

Rooney never scored an international hat-trick, although he scored twice in a match on ten occasions.  He scored more times against San Marino than against any other team, with five goals against them. More than half of Rooney's goals came away from home: he scored 18 at Wembley Stadium and four in Manchester (two each at Old Trafford and the City of Manchester Stadium).

The majority of Rooney's goals came in qualifying matches. He scored 16 in World Cup qualifiers, including nine during the 2010 World Cup qualification round where he finished as the second-equal top scorer, alongside Bosnia and Herzegovina's Edin Džeko and one behind Greece's Theofanis Gekas. Rooney also scored 14 times in European Championship qualifiers. He scored four times in Euro 2004, ending the tournament as the second-equal top scorer alongside the Netherlands' Ruud van Nistelrooy and one behind the Czech Republic's Milan Baroš.  He scored only once in the World Cup finals, in a 2–1 loss to Uruguay in 2014.  The remainder of Rooney's goals, 16, came in friendlies.

International goals
England score listed first, score column indicates score after each Rooney goal.

Statistics
Source:

Notes

References

Goals
Goals
Rooney, Wayne